James Jenkins Simpson (24 November 1881 – 10 November 1936) was a British entomologist and marine biologist who worked in West Africa and Turkey.

Background
Simpson was the son of a gardener from Elgin; he studied at Elgin West End School and Aberdeen Free Church Training College before graduating M.A. from Aberdeen University in 1904. He was a Carnegie Research Scholar and Fellow at Aberdeen. He joined the British Indian government to study pearl oyster fisheries in southern Burma in 1906 and then worked in East Africa with the Nyassa Company. 

In 1909 an Entomological Research Committee was formed to study ticks of economic importance in Africa. Simpson and Sheffield Airey Neave were appointed travelling entomologists and he collected mosquitoes, Tabanids, bed-bugs, fleas, lice and ticks in Nigeria in 1910 followed by visits to the Gold Coast and Sierra Leone. In 1919 Simpson joined the National Museum of Wales as Keeper of Zoology and in 1926 became Curator of the Public Museums of Liverpool. 

He then took up a position in Turkey to head the Department of Oceanography and Marine Biological Research. Travelling from Greece on the ship Kyrenia, he was found missing from his cabin, last seen on the morning of 10 November 1936 and presumed drowned.

See also
List of people who disappeared mysteriously at sea

Publications 
 Simpson J. J. and Brown R. (1910) Asteroidea of Portuguese East-Afrika. Proceedings of the Royal Society of Edinburgh 18:45–60.
 
 
 
 

 
 Simpson, J. J.(1926). Report on rats and their parasitic fleas. Report of the Medical Officer of Health, Cardiff (1925): 20-23.

References

1930s missing person cases
British entomologists
Missing person cases in Greece
People lost at sea